Solitude in Madness is the twelfth studio album by the Polish death metal band Vader, released by Nuclear Blast on 1 May 2020. It is the band's final album featuring drummer James Stewart before his departure in February 2022.

Release
In summer 2019, Vader went to Grindstone Studios in Suffolk, England. There, the band teamed up with Scott Atkins who engineered, mixed and produced the album.

Vader announced album's release on 6 March 2020. The same day, the band collaborated with Hotel Radio to live-stream their upcoming performance at Underworld in London on 9 March 2020.

Track listing

Personnel
Vader
Piotr "Peter" Wiwczarek – lead guitar, vocals
Marek Pajak – rhythm guitar
Tomasz Halicki – bass
James Stewart – drums

Production
Scott Atkins – producing, mixing
Wes Benscoter – artwork

Charts

References

2020 albums
Nuclear Blast albums
Albums with cover art by Wes Benscoter